Mariella Valentini (born 23 June 1959) is an Italian actress.

Life and career 
Born in Milan, Valentini studied acting at the Accademia dei Filodrammatici and in a mime school. In 1983, she made her film debut in the comedy film Come dire. Prolific in film, television, and on stage, she was nominated twice in the best supporting actress category at the David di Donatello, in 1989 for Nanni Moretti's Red Wood Pigeon and in 1991 for Maurizio Nichetti's To Want to Fly.

References

External links 
 

Italian film actresses
Italian television actresses
Italian stage actresses
1959 births
Actresses from Milan
Living people